Bernardino da Asola (c.1490–1540) was a 16th-century Italian painter.

Biography
He was born in Asola, Lombardy as the son of Giovanni da Asola or Giovanni da Brescia. He worked with his father on Duomo of Asola, Lombardy in 1518 and in 1526 he and his father painted a set of organ shutters for the San Michele in Murano (now in Museo Correr).

He died in Venice.

References

Bernardino da Asola on Artnet

1490s births
1540 deaths
16th-century Italian painters
Italian male painters
Artists from the Province of Mantua
Painters from Venice
Year of birth uncertain
People from Asola, Lombardy